Amir Angwe (1966 – 29 October 1995) was a Nigerian international footballer who played for BCC Lions and Julius Berger, and represented the Nigeria national football team. He died following a heart attack in an African Cup Winners' Cup game against Mozambique side Maxaquene.

Career statistics

International

References

1995 deaths
Association football forwards
Association football players who died while playing
BCC Lions F.C. players
Bridge F.C. players
Nigeria international footballers
Nigerian footballers
Sport deaths in Nigeria